Martin Obšitník (born 2 November 1969, in Košice) is a former Slovak professional football midfielder who currently plays for FC Petržalka akadémia. Obšitník is a participant of 1989 FIFA World Youth Championship. He played for Slovakia four games in 1994. He played in the Gambrinus liga for two seasons with Dynamo České Budějovice.

References

External links
 
 

1969 births
Living people
Association football midfielders
Slovak footballers
Slovakia international footballers
FK Inter Bratislava players
FC VSS Košice players
Czech First League players
SK Dynamo České Budějovice players
ŠK Slovan Bratislava players
FC Petržalka players
Slovak Super Liga players
Sportspeople from Košice